Sabri Al-Haiki is a painter, critic and poet from Yemen.

Sabri Abdulkarim Galeb Al-Haiki.

He was born in (Aokaba) Taiz in Yemen on 25 December 1961. 

He began his literary and artistic life at the age of fifteen. He published his poetic works and critical writings in official newspapers and specialized literary journals such as, the Egyptian magazine poetry. He was a member of both the Union of Yemeni Writers and the Arab Writers Union. He was a founding member of the Yemeni Artists Syndicate. He was also responsible for editing art magazines and literary magazines in the Ministry of Culture in Yemen. His biography was published in the Encyclopedia of the Almoheet,
in the Dictionary of Poets 1/6 from the Pre-Islamic Period to the year 2000 C2, and in the Dictionary of Writers 1/7 from the Pre-Islamic Period to the year 2000 C3.

Founding Member of the "Modern art Group", Sanaa – Yemen. (1992).

One of the pioneers of the Yemeni theater. The first academic in dramatic criticism in Yemen.

The Ministry of Culture awarded him the honorary shield for the pioneers of the Yemeni theater. In addition to a cash prize in 2010.
A member of the PhilPapers community.

About him 
Sabri Al haiki, started writing in Taiz for the official newspaper of the Republic in 1978. He had a fixed column on the last page in the name of obsessions.In 1979, Sabri Al-Haiki was a founding member of the Yemeni Writers and Writers Union branch. During his studies, he secured a position with the Ministry of Information and Culture working morning and studying in the evening. He moved to Sana'a. He edited the arts page in the Revolution newspaper. After completing his high school, he received a scholarship to study drama from the state of Kuwait and then in 1985, he returned to Yemen after receiving his bachelor's degree in criticism and theatrical literature. In Yemen he has been responsible for editing the Literary, Magazine (new in Yemen). He was also a founding member of the Yemeni artists Syndicate in addition to being a member of the Union of Arab Writers.

Founding Member of the "Modern Art Group", Sanaa – Yemen. (1992).

Education
 Bachelor of Criticism and Theatrical Literature, Higher Institute of Theatrical Art, Kuwait, 1985.
 High Diploma and Public administration National Institute of Administrative Science, Sana'a 1997.
 Diploma, Drama and Criticism; Academy of Arts, Cairo, 2001–2003.
 Master of Arts Dramatic; Academy of Arts, Cairo, 2003–2006.
 2021 Ph.D.In Technicals of novel.

Scientific Studies and Research
• The problem of compatibility in the character of Drama Hero 1985 Kuwait, Higher Institute of Dramatic Arts. (BA from the Department of criticism and literature), published in the magazine Yemen new in March 1998.

• Administrative establishment in Yemen applied to the General Organization of Theater and Cinema 1995 National Institute of Administrative Sciences Sana'a.

• The technique features of Playwriting in Yemen, Academy of Arts Cairo 2006.

• In addition to a large number of studies published in newspapers, magazines and cultural sites.

His works

Published Books 
studies:

• signifier and substitution in the sources of the text, Sana'a, Abadi Center for Studies and Publication, 2008.
 
• Irony in the Yemeni Novelist Text, Critics Make a Wave for the Sea, (in conjunction with a group of researchers), Sana'a, Yemeni Literary and Writers Union, 2008.

Irony in the art of caricature, Naji al-Ali, (together with a group of researchers), [Sana'a], Center for Yemeni Studies and Research, 2008.

Texts:

 Zaid Al-Moushaki, "A Historical Story of the Boys", on the Children's Book Series, Ministry of Information and Culture, Sana'a, 1983. (Novel).
 Poetry in the Time of Chaos, 1985, Commercial Printing, Kuwait. Poetry
 Abundance, 1990, the printing press of Akrama, Syria. (Poetry).
 Fortune-Teller, play 1992.
 L'ivre Caravane, Paris, Sous le patronage de I'Unesco, 1993.
 2000 AD, anthology poems, in French, with some of the works of the pictorial images "Azabel and Les":
Yemen Peuple des Sables, "Belgium",  LA RENAISSANCE LIVR, 2000.

• Participation in ((the dictionary of the Babtain contemporary Arab poets)).

 Participation in the Dictionary of Poets 1–6 from the pre-Islamic to the year 2000, 2c.
Participation in the dictionary of Writers 1–7 from the pre-Islamic to the year 2000, C 3.

 1995, Studied some of his poetry, in some scientific messages and research, such as a doctorate, in stylistic in modern Yemeni poetry Ain Shams University – Cairo. Dr. Ahmed Kassem Al-Zomor.
 Papers from the Abundance piography, (Novel), (Magazine, published the Yemeni Writers Union, June 2007).
 Philosophy of substitution, 2007-2022.(Search is a refereed).
 Irony in the text, 2013. (New Study).

Exhibitions 
• January 1994, the first personal exhibition (Damon Hall) sponsored by the Ministry of Culture, Sana'a.

• March 1996, the second personal exhibition, Sana'a University.

• October 1997 Third Personal Exhibition, Cultural Center (Ministry of Culture) Sana'a.

• Participated in many local and foreign group exhibitions.

• More than a hundred paintings of his works, personal and official collections. Especially in the countries of Europe.

Awards 
Received A certificate of distinguished works in the first forum of plastic arts, Sanaa, in May 1996.

Career 
– 1980, acting director of theater. The Ministry of Information and the Culture of Sana'a.

– 87–1989 SecretaryEditor of the new Yemen magazine, the Ministry of Media and Culture.

– 1991 Deputy Editor in Chief of the Arts Magazine.

– 1991 Deputy editor of the magazine Yemen new.
– 1992 Director (founder) of theatrical activity in the General Organization of Theater and Cinema.

– 1993 Director (founder) of the film production department, in the General Organization of Theater and Cinema.

1996 Member of the Advisory Board of Culture magazine, Ministry of Culture.

– 1998 Director General (Founder) of the Office of Culture Governorate of the shadow.

– 2001 Deputy Editor-in-Chief of the Culture, Ministry of Culture.

Some Bibliography 
Sabri Haiqui
 1997, Logo disgine of General Yemenian Book Organization.
 1997, DIsgine Covere of HeelTaps,(Coffection of Poetry and Prose) by:Sulaiman Al-ISSA.
 Manager of editing: Yemeni Culture Magazine, Year 11 Issue 66-67-68-69. 2002. 
 New Yemen Magazine, March 1988 Study of Adjustment Problem in character drama hero.P29-62.
 7 May 1987, interview in: Art Supplement United Arab Emirates newspaper.
 2007, Novel text, in: wisdom Magazine, published by the Yemeni Writers Union, June 2007.
 Stylistic in modern Yemeni poetry, pp 308–316.‹Book› for "Dr. Ahmed Kassem Al-Zomor",(First edition),1996.

References

External links
 Official website
 Ensiklopedie of almoheet Sabri Al-Haiki
Netorking system for scientific research Sabri Al-Haiki
Sabri Al-Haiki
 Sabri Al_Haiki
 معجم الأدباء من العصر الجاهلي حتى سنة 2002 - ج 3 - س - عبد الفتاح الصعيدي
Sabri Al-Haiki (Academy of Arts. Cairo. (Alumnus)) - PhilPeople
 معجم الأدباء 1-7 من العصر الجاهلي حتى سنة 2002م ج3
 Library of Congress LCCN Permalink n2009204968
 83515009
 Texture Experiments in Paintings, inspired Sabri Al-Haiki and Giza Elwazir
 Yémen, peuple des sables / Isabelle Wets
 موسوعة بيبليوغرافيا الأدب اليمني: بيبليوغرافيا القصة القصيرة والقصيرة القصيرة جدا
 Site is undergoing maintenance
 Sabri Al-Haiki (Academy of Arts. Cairo. (Alumnus)) - PhilPeople
 

1961 births
Living people
20th-century Yemeni writers
21st-century Yemeni writers
Yemeni artists
Yemeni poets
Yemeni dramatists and playwrights